SlaughtaHouse is the debut studio album by American hip hop group Masta Ace Incorporated and the second album by Brooklyn-based rapper Masta Ace. It was released on May 4, 1993, through Delicious Vinyl. Recording sessions took place at Firehouse Studios in Brooklyn. Production was handled by Masta Ace under his producer moniker 'Ase One', as well as the Bluez Brothas, Uneek, Latief, and the Beatheads, with Orlando Aguillen serving as executive producer. It peaked at number 134 on the Billboard 200 in the United States.

The loose concept of the album is addressing the growing trend of violence in hip-hop music at the time, notably from gangsta rap. He addresses this satirically in the over-the-top single "Slaughtahouse". The album infuses West Coast funk-influenced beats with rough "New York rhyming". The 2008 repress of the album includes the single "Born to Roll", a bass-heavy remix of "Jeep Ass Niguh". This version became a hit single in 1994, reaching the Top 25 on the Billboard Hot 100. The song also presaged a new bass-heavy direction on his next album, Sittin' on Chrome.

The album was reissued twice in recent years. The first reissue was released in 2008. The second reissue was released in December 2013 as a deluxe edition with a second disc of 17 additional remixes, accapellas and rarities.

Track listing

Personnel
Duval "Masta Ace"/"Ase One" Clear – performer (tracks: 1–13, 15), producer (tracks: 6–9, 11, 14), co-producer (tracks: 3, 5, 12), arranger (track 2), recording, mixing, art direction
Sean "Uneek"/"MC Negro" McFadden – performer (tracks: 2, 15), producer (tracks: 1, 2, 6, 15), co-producer (track 7)
Courtney "Eyce"/"The Ignorant MC" McFadden – performer (tracks: 2, 14, 15)
Reginald "Lord Digga" Ellis – performer (tracks: 2, 5, 7–9, 13, 15), producer (tracks: 4, 10, 12, 13), co-producer (track 9)
Paula Perry – performer (tracks: 2, 10)
Leschea A. Boatwright – performer (track 14)
Anthony "Latief" King – producer (tracks: 3, 8), co-producer (track 11)
Norman "Witchdoc" Glover – producer (tracks: 4, 10, 12, 13), co-producer (track 9)
Christian Schneider – producer (track 5)
Jochen Wenke – producer (track 5)
Orlando Aguillen – executive producer
Blaise Dupuy – recording, mixing
Tony Dawsey – mastering
George DuBose – art direction, design, photography
Jonathan Pollack – management

Charts

References

External links

1993 albums
Masta Ace albums
Delicious Vinyl albums